Parliamentary elections were held in the Faroe Islands on 20 January 2004.

Results

See also
List of members of the Løgting, 2004–08

References

Elections in the Faroe Islands
Faroes
2004 in the Faroe Islands
January 2004 events in Europe